Lutz Goepel (born 10 October 1942 in Gotha, Thuringia) is a German politician who served as a Member of the European Parliament from 1994 until 2009, representing Saxony.
 
He is a member of the conservative Christian Democratic Union, part of the European People's Party. In 1990 he was elected as a member of the People's Chamber of the German Democratic Republic, representing the Democratic Farmers' Party of Germany (DBD), which later merged with the CDU.

References

1942 births
Living people
People from Gotha (town)
Democratic Farmers' Party of Germany politicians
MEPs for Germany 2004–2009
Christian Democratic Union of Germany MEPs
MEPs for Germany 1999–2004